Northeast Manual Training School, also known as Edison High School, was a historic school building located in the Fairhill neighborhood of Philadelphia, Pennsylvania.  It was built in 1903-1905 as a 3-story, random-coursed granite building in the Romanesque style.  It featured a center turret, flanked by projecting gable ends.

A fire on August 3, 2011, destroyed most of the interior, but the structural walls remained in good condition.  The school, which had been closed in 2009 and then inhabited by squatters, was demolished in late 2011.

It was added to the National Register of Historic Places in 1986.

References

External links

School buildings on the National Register of Historic Places in Philadelphia
Romanesque Revival architecture in Pennsylvania
School buildings completed in 1905
Upper North Philadelphia
1905 establishments in Pennsylvania
Demolished buildings and structures in Philadelphia
Buildings and structures demolished in 2011